Bigg Boss 2 is the second season of the Telugu-language version of the Indian reality television series Bigg Boss. It premiered on 10 June 2018 on Star Maa. Nani hosted the show. It was the second longest season (112 days) in Indian versions of Bigg Boss. Unlike the first season, this season featured general public along with celebrities as housemates. For this season of Bigg Boss, a lavish house set has been constructed in Backlots of Annapurna Studios 7 Acres, Jubilee Hills, Hyderabad.

The season was extended by one week (112 days) instead of the actual 105 days format of the show. Among the five finalists, Kaushal Manda emerged as the winner with highest number of public votes, followed by Geetha Madhuri as runner-up, Tanish Alladi, Deepti Nallamothu and Samrat Reddy as third, fourth and fifth respectively.

Housemates status

Housemates

Original entrants
The participants in the order they entered the house are:

Celebrities
 Geetha Madhuri - Singer
 Amit Tiwari - Actor
 Deepti Nallamothu  - TV9 Anchor
 Tanish Alladi - Actor
 Babu Gogineni - Indian humanist, rationalist and human rights activist
 Bhanu Sree - Actress
 Roll Rida - Rapper and singer
 Syamala - Anchor and actress
 Kireeti Damaraju - Actor
 Deepthi Sunaina - Social media personality and actress
 Kaushal Manda - Actor and model
 Tejaswi Madivada - Actress
 Samrat Reddy - Actor and cricketer

Commoners
 Ganesh - Radio Jockey,  Vijayawada.
 Sanjana Anne - Model, Miss Hyderabad, Miss India Participant, Vijayawada.
 Nutan Naidu - Social Activist, Visakhapatnam.

Wild Card
 Nandini Rai - Actress, Model
 Pooja Ramachandran - Actress, Model

Reception
 Host Nani has been targeted for biased hosting. Later, host Nani responded to accusations of bias and replied that he is not biased and he treats every housemate equally.
 The audience expressed their annoyance with host Nani, Star Maa and producer Endemol Shine India about voting and evictions of the show.

Guests

References

External links
 Official Website at Hotstar

2018 Indian television seasons
02